The Last Warrior (also known as The Last Patrol) is a 2000 American action film directed by Sheldon Lettich, and starring Dolph Lundgren, Sherri Alexander, Joe Michael Burke, Rebecca Cross and Brook Susan Parker. The film was released on direct-to-video in the United States on August 21, 2001.

Plot
An earthquake measuring 9.5 on the Richter Scale splits California into an island with a perpetual dustcloud hanging over it. The survivors of the terrible ordeal have started to come together in the shape of Nick Preston (Dolph Lundgren) an air force captain, and other fractions of the military, including Sarah McBride (Sherri Alexander) and Lucky Simcoe (Joe Michael Burke), and have situated themselves in a warfare junkyard, holding weaponry from forgotten conflicts. They are searching for food, fuel and fellow survivors, and a possible path into the next world, while also dodging a violent plague that causes the skin to boil.

Cast

 Dolph Lundgren as Captain Nick Preston
 Sherri Alexander as Captain Sarah McBride
 Joe Michael Burke as Sergeant Lucky Simcoe
 Rebecca Cross as Candy
 Brook Susan Parker as Rainbow
 Juliano Mer as Jesus
 Chanan Elias as Simon Peace
 Ze'ev Revach as Cooky
 Angelique Lettich as Tamara
 Terry Big Charles as Pope
 Howard Rypp as Will
 Gilya Stern as Miriam
 Ishai Golan as Jasper
 Jack Adalist as Ferguson
 Nati Ravitz as State Trooper

Production

Filming
It was filmed in Eilat, Israel over the course of 42 days from May 18 to June 29, 1999.

Release

Home media
On 27 November 2000, DVD was released by Planet at the United Kingdom in Region 2.

On August 21, 2001 DVD was released by Lionsgate at the United States in Region 1.

On 13 July 2009, DVD was released by Anchor Bay Entertainment at the United Kingdom in Region 2.

External links
 
 

2000 films
2000 direct-to-video films
2000 science fiction action films
American science fiction action films
2000s English-language films
Films set in Israel
Films about nuclear war and weapons
American post-apocalyptic films
Films directed by Sheldon Lettich
Films scored by David Michael Frank
Films shot in Israel
2000s American films